Maximum inner-product search (MIPS) is a search problem, with a corresponding class of search algorithms which attempt to maximise the inner product between a query and the data items to be retrieved. MIPS algorithms are used in a wide variety of big data applications, including recommendation algorithms and machine learning.

Formally, for a database of vectors  defined over a set of labels  in an inner product space with an inner product  defined on it, MIPS search can be defined as the problem of determining

for a given query .

Although there is an obvious linear-time implementation, it is generally too slow to be used on practical problems. However, efficient algorithms exist to speed up MIPS search.

MIPS can be viewed as equivalent to a nearest neighbor search (NNS) problem in which maximizing the inner product is equivalent to minimizing the corresponding distance metric in the NNS problem. Like other forms of NNS, MIPS algorithms may be approximate or exact.

MIPS search is used as part of DeepMind's RETRO algorithm.

References

See also 
 Nearest neighbor search

Search algorithms
Computational problems
Machine learning